Pádraig Cusack (born 16 March 1962) is an Irish theatre producer who has worked with the National Theatre of Great Britain, the Abbey Theatre Dublin, the NCPA Mumbai and numerous international festivals.

Personal life
The youngest son of the Irish actor Cyril Cusack and actress Maureen Cusack, he is the brother of actresses Niamh Cusack, Sinéad Cusack and Sorcha Cusack, and half-brother of Catherine Cusack. He has one brother, Paul Cusack (a television producer).  He is married and has two daughters, Megan, an actress, who in 2020 joined the leading cast in the Netflix/BBC popular series  Call the Midwife in the recurring role of Nurse Nancy Corrigan, and Kitty, a psychology student. Two of his nephews are also actors, Max Irons and Calam Lynch.

Education 
Cusack was educated bi-lingually in Irish and English, initially at Scoil Lorcáin in Monkstown, Co. Dublin, and subsequently at Coláiste Eoin, Booterstown, Co. Dublin. Pádraig was a Taylor Exhibition music scholar at Trinity College, Dublin, before winning a scholarship to train at the Royal Northern College of Music to be a professional cellist. In 1995, he returned to education to take a post-graduate degree in Business at University College, Cork.

Career 
Having begun his career as a freelance musician, playing with the BBC Philharmonic Orchestra and English National Opera North, an accident ended his career as a musician, resulting in him pursuing a career in arts administration. Initially he focused on the classical music sector, working at two leading concert venues in London, the Wigmore Hall and the Southbank Centre.  

In 1992 he made his first move into theatre following his appointment as Administrative Director of West Yorkshire Playhouse in Leeds, alongside Jude Kelly where he produced a number of plays including the touring production of Five Guys Named Moe for Cameron Mackintosh Limited. In 1996, he was appointed Head of Planning of the Royal National Theatre under the outgoing artistic director, Sir Richard Eyre and subsequently with Sir Trevor Nunn and Sir Nicholas Hytner. In 2009 he became the National Theatre's Associate Producer.  During this period he produced numerous productions for tour both in the UK and internationally, taking the work of the National Theatre to five continents.  Alongside this, he has worked as a touring consultant for the Abbey Theatre in Dublin, the Royal Court Theatre, London, Fiery Angel in London's West End, Canadian Stage in Toronto, Bangarra Dance Theatre in Sydney, TheEmergencyRoom and Corn Exchange in Dublin and Galway International Arts Festival.  In June 2016, he was appointed Executive Producer of Wales Millennium Centre in Cardiff.  In addition to this, he is Consultant Producer to the National Centre for the Performing Arts (India) in Mumbai.

As well as his theatre producing work, Cusack offers representation to a number of Irish artists including the director Annie Ryan, the composer Mel Mercier and the British playwright Matt Wilkinson.

In 2023, Cusack was the recipient of the Olwen Wymark Award from the Writers' Guild of Great Britain for his championing of new writing which was presented at the 18th Annual Awards Ceremony in London.

Selected dramatography - international touring

References 

1962 births
Living people
Irish theatre managers and producers
People from County Dublin
People from Dalkey
Alumni of Trinity College Dublin
Padraig
People educated at Coláiste Eoin